Nicolas Mahut and Vasek Pospisil were the defending champions, but they chose not to participate.

Lloyd Glasspool and Harri Heliövaara won the title, defeating Sander Arends and David Pel in the final, 7–5, 7–6(7–4).

Seeds

Draw

Draw

References

External Links
 Main draw

2021 ATP Tour
2021 Open 13 Provence - Doubles
2021 in French tennis